Anna Veleva is a Bulgarian soprano.

She has appeared at major opera houses, recital and concert halls in the United States, Europe and Japan. She made her Carnegie Hall debut in February 2007 as the featured soloist in a concert produced by the International Raoul Wallenberg Foundation, honoring survivors and rescuers in the Holocaust.

Among her recent roles have been Violetta in Verdi's La Traviata, Gilda in Rigoletto, Musette in Puccini's La Boheme and Michaela in Bizet's Carmen produced by Columbia Artists Management.

Veleva came to prominence in 2003 after her critically acclaimed debut at the Sofia National Opera in the role of Lucia in Donizetti's Lucia di Lammermoor. Since making her debut, she has been engaged by Opera Verdi Europa to perform Lucia and a number of other prominent roles, including Gilda (Rigoletto) and Musetta (La Bohème). She also sang with the Bourgass and Varna Opera companies, and toured the United States with the Plovdiv Opera.

Veleva has appeared in prominent classical music venues in Germany, Austria, Switzerland and Poland in addition to her native country, Bulgaria, where she performed in the New Years Gala Concert at the National Palace of Culture in Sofia, conducted by Maestro Emil Tabakov. She has also sung at musical festivals in Boston and Gettysburg, and special concert programs at the World Bank in Washington and United Nations in New York.

She received her bachelor's and master's degrees in music at the State Academy of Music, Pancho Vladigerov, in Sofia. She then continued her studies in New York, where she received a professional postgraduate diploma in vocal performance from the Mannes College of Music. After finishing her two-year program with honors, she continued her professional training in New York with renowned opera singer Renata Scotto. In 2003 she studied theatre performance with renowned actor Alec Baldwin, at the South Hampton College in New York. Among her awards have been prizes in the G.Zl.Cherkin Competition and the Spoletto Vocal Art Competition.

References

External links
AnnaVeleva,com

Bulgarian operatic sopranos
Year of birth missing (living people)
Living people
Place of birth missing (living people)
21st-century Bulgarian women opera singers